Ali Muhammed oglu Huseynli (azərb. Əli Hüseynli, born October 8, 1968, Baku) is a political figure, candidate of juridical sciences, member of the New Azerbaijan Party, assistant to the Chairman of the Milli Majlis of the Azerbaijan [SA1] (1996-2000), Deputy of the Milli Majlis (since 2000), member of the working groups on Inter-parliamentary relations Azerbaijan-Estonia, Azerbaijan-Algeria, Azerbaijan-Ukraine, Azerbaijan-Japan, member of the Azerbaijani representatives in the parliamentary Assembly of the European Council, Deputy Chairman of the Commission on Legal Affairs of the IPA CIS, Chairman of the Legal Policies and State Structuring Committee of Milli Majlis, first Deputy Chairman of the National Assembly of Azerbaijan (since March 10, 2020).

Biography 
Ali Huseynli was born in 1968. He graduated from the law faculty of Baku State University.

In 1991–1995, he was a session secretary, consultant, and assistant to the Chairman of the Supreme Court of Azerbaijan.

Political activity 
In 1995, Ali Huseynli was appointed as a specialist in the Executive office of the President of Azerbaijan.

In 1996–2000, he worked as an assistant to the Chairman of Milli Majlis.

On March 10, 2020, at the first plenary meeting of the Milli Majlis of Azerbaijan of the 6th convocation, Ali Huseynli was elected first deputy speaker of the Parliament of Azerbaijan.  He is also the chairman of the Legal Policies and State Structuring Committee at the Parliament of Azerbaijan.

See also 
Azerbaijan

National Assembly (Azerbaijan)

Sahiba Gafarova

Hijran Huseynova

References

External links 
 Official website of the National Assembly of Azerbaijan

Azerbaijani politicians
Azerbaijani diplomats
1968 births
Living people
Baku State University alumni
Members of the 6th convocation of the National Assembly (Azerbaijan)